Derek Underwood, a slow left-arm orthodox bowler, represented the England cricket team in 86 Tests between 1966 and 1982. In cricket, a five-wicket haul (also known as a "five-for" or "fifer") refers to a bowler taking five or more wickets in a single innings. This is regarded as a notable achievement, and as of 2015, only 42 bowlers have taken at least 15 five-wicket hauls at international level in their cricketing careers. In Test cricket, Underwood took 297 wickets, including 17 five-wicket hauls.  The Wisden Cricketers' Almanack named him one of their cricketers of the year in 1969, and in 2009 was one of the 55 inaugural members of the ICC Cricket Hall of Fame.

Underwood made his Test debut during the third Test of the West Indies tour of England in 1966, at Trent Bridge. His first Test five-wicket haul came in the second Test of Pakistan during their 1967 tour at Trent Bridge. Underwood's seventeen five-wicket hauls places him joint-third in a list of most five-wicket hauls by England Test players, behind Ian Botham and Sydney Barnes. By the end of his career, he had claimed five-wicket hauls in both innings of a match on three occasions, twice against New Zealand He went on to take ten or more wickets in a match on six occasions. In Tests, Underwood was most successful against New Zealand, with six five-wicket hauls. His career-best figures for an innings were 8 wickets for 53 runs at Lord's, against Pakistan in 1974. Following up his 5 for 20 in the first innings of that match to achieve his best match figures of 8 for 71.

Underwood made his One Day International (ODI) debut against New Zealand at St. Helen's Rugby and Cricket Ground, Swansea in 1973. He never took a five-wicket haul in his 26 ODIs; his career-best figures for an innings were 4 wickets for 44 runs against the West Indies during the 1979–80 Australian Tri-Series, a match England won by 2 runs at the Sydney Cricket Ground. As of 2015, Underwood is twenty-ninth overall among all-time combined five-wicket haul takers.

Key

Test five-wicket hauls

Notes

References

General

Specific

External links
 

Underwood, Derek
Lists of English cricket records and statistics
Underwood, Derek